Levan Shalvovych Makharadze (born 14 August 1993) is a Georgian footballer who is last known to have played as a defender for Ordino.

Career

Born in Georgia, he spent his youth career in Ukraine at the FC Dnipro academy.

Makharadez started his senior career with Mariupol.

Before the 2015 season, Makharadze signed for Latvian side Skonto.

In the second half of 2015–16, he signed for Ukrainian third division club Inhulets, where he made 10 league appearances and scored 2 goals.

In 2016, he signed for Kolos Kovalivka.

In the second half of 2017–18, Makharadze signed for Zalla in the Spanish fifth division after playing for Ukrainian second division outfit Sumy.

In 2018, he signed for Ordino in Andorra.

References

External links
 Profile at Official UAF Website
 
 

1993 births
Living people
Footballers from Tbilisi
Ukrainian people of Georgian descent
Expatriate footballers in Latvia
Ukrainian expatriate sportspeople in Latvia
Expatriate footballers in Andorra
Ukrainian expatriate sportspeople in Andorra
Ukrainian expatriate footballers
Expatriate footballers in Spain
Ukrainian expatriate sportspeople in Spain
Latvian Higher League players
Association football defenders
Ukrainian footballers
FC Dnipro-2 Dnipropetrovsk players
FC Kolos Kovalivka players
FC Cherkashchyna players
PFC Sumy players
FC Inhulets Petrove players
FC Mariupol players
Skonto FC players
Primera Divisió players 
FC Ordino players
Ukrainian First League players
Ukrainian Second League players
Dnipro Academy people